Pantoporia dindinga, the greyline lascar, is a species of nymphalid butterfly found in Asia, where it ranges from Burma to Peninsular Malaysia, Bangka, Borneo and possibly Sumatra.

References

Pantoporia
Butterflies of Borneo
Butterflies of Indochina
Butterflies described in 1879